NGC 1345 is a barred spiral galaxy in the constellation Eridanus. It was discovered by John Herschel on Dec 11, 1835.

See also
 List of NGC objects (1001–2000)

References

External links

Barred spiral galaxies
Eridanus (constellation)
1345
012979